Vachellia haematoxylon (gray camel thorn, giraffe thorn) is a protected tree in South Africa.

See also
List of Southern African indigenous trees

References

haematoxylon
Protected trees of South Africa